Harry "Red" Miller (born 1889) was an American college football player and coach. A graduate and college football player at the University of Notre Dame, Miller served as the head football coach at Creighton University in Omaha, Nebraska from 1910 to 1914.

He was the father of Notre Dame player Creighton Miller, whom he named after Creighton University. He was also the older brother of Don Miller, one of Notre Dame's famous Four Horsemen.

References

1889 births
Year of death missing
American football centers
American football halfbacks
Creighton Bluejays football coaches
Notre Dame Fighting Irish football players